The Hegedus indole synthesis is a name reaction in organic chemistry that allows for the generation of indoles through palladium(II)-mediated oxidative cyclization of ortho-alkenyl anilines. The reaction can still take place for tosyl-protected amines.

Application
2-Allylaniline can be converted to 2-Methylindole using the Hegedus indole synthesis.

References

Indole forming reactions
Carbon-heteroatom bond forming reactions
Name reactions